Food Records was a British rock record label set up in 1984 by David Balfe (formally of Zoo Records), who later took on Andy Ross as his partner. Originally formed as an independent record label with distribution going through Rough Trade Distribution, Food also licensed acts through WEA Records, before becoming closely associated with the EMI group's Parlophone label. EMI invested in the label and then in 1994 EMI gained complete control and folded it into Parlophone in 2000. Ross died in 2022 aged 66.

Artists
Food was sold to EMI by David Balfe in 1994. Andy Ross continued running Food as a sub-label of EMI, where it was the record label of Blur, Strangelove, Idlewild, Jesus Jones, Dubstar, The Supernaturals, Octopus and Grass Show.

The Food Christmas EP

In December 1989, Food Records released The Food Christmas EP (FOOD 23) that featured Food artists covering each other's songs. Crazyhead covered Diesel Park West's "Like Princes Do", Jesus Jones covered Crazyhead's "I Don't Want That Kind Of Love" and Diesel Park West covered Jesus Jones' "Info-Freako". The EP was released on CD, 7" vinyl, 12" and a limited gatefold sleeve 12" vinyl.

The EP charted at #63 on the UK Singles Chart.

Track listing (7" and 12")
"I Don't Want That Kind Of Love" (Reverb) – 4:10 performed by Jesus Jones
"Like Princes Do" (John Butler) – 3:25 performed by Crazyhead
"Info Freako" (Mike Edwards) – 3:52 performed by Diesel Park West
CD versions reverse the track order to begin with "Info Freako".

Credits
Mike Edwards - producer ("I Don't Want That Kind Of Love")
Rick Wilson - producer ("Like Princes Do" and "Info Freako")
John Butler - producer ("Info Freako")

See also
 List of record labels

References

Defunct record labels of the United Kingdom
1984 establishments in the United Kingdom
2000 disestablishments in the United Kingdom
Record labels established in 1984
Record labels disestablished in 2000
British independent record labels
EMI
Parlophone subsidiaries
Indie rock record labels
Pop record labels